CID may refer to:

Film
 C.I.D. (1955 film), an Indian Malayalam film
 C.I.D. (1956 film), an Indian Hindi film
 C. I. D. (1965 film), an Indian Telugu film
 C.I.D. (1990 film), an Indian Hindi film

Television
 CID (Indian TV series)
 C.I.D. (Singaporean TV series)

Organizations

Police units
 Criminal Investigation Department (disambiguation)
 Criminal Investigation Division (disambiguation)
 United States Army Criminal Investigation Division

Other organizations
 Center for International Development, at Harvard University
 Central Institute for the Deaf
 Committee of Imperial Defence, a former part of the government of Great Britain and the British Empire
 Conseil International de la Danse, an umbrella organization for all forms of dance in the world
 Council of Industrial Design, a UK body renamed the Design Council
 University of Colombo, Centre for Instrument Development, in Sri Lanka

Science and technology

Biology and medicine
 Clinical Infectious Diseases, a medical journal
 Cytomegalic inclusion disease
Chromosomal Interacting Domain, a self-interacting domain in bacteria

Chemistry
 Collision-induced dissociation, a mass spectrometry mechanism
 Compound identification number, a field in the PubChem database
 Configuration interaction doubles, in quantum chemistry

Computing and telecommunications
 Caller ID, a telephone service that transmits the caller's telephone number to the called party
 Card Identification Number, a security feature on credit cards
 Cell ID, used to identify cell phone towers
  of the Universidad de La Habana
 Certified Interconnect Designer, a certification for printed circuit-board designers
 CID fonts, a font file format

Other uses in science and technology
 Channel-iron deposits, one of the major sources of saleable iron ore
 Controlled Impact Demonstration, a project to improve aircraft crash survivability
 Cubic inch displacement, a measurement in internal combustion engines

Other uses
 Centro Insular de Deportes, an indoor sports arena in Spain
 CID The Dummy, a video game
 Combat Identification, the accurate characterization of detected objects for military action
 Common-interest development, a form of housing
 Community improvement district, an area within which businesses are required to pay an additional tax
 The Eastern Iowa Airport (IATA code CID), serving Cedar Rapids, Iowa
 Corpus des inscriptions de Delphes, a compendium of ancient Greek inscriptions from Delphi

See also
 Cid (disambiguation)
 SID (disambiguation)